Pottawatomie Township is a township in Franklin County, Kansas, USA.  As of the 2000 census, its population was 669.

Geography
According to the USGS, it contains three cemeteries: Baker, Lane and Needham.

The streams of Hahn Branch, Mosquito Creek, Pottawatomie Creek, North Fork Sac Branch and South Fork Sac Branch run through this township.

History

On May 24, 1856, during the Bleeding Kansas period of it was in Pottawatomie Township (north of Lane) at Dutch Henry's Crossing, on the Pottawatomie Creek, where the infamous Pottawatomie massacre took place.  John Brown led a raid on a pro-slavery family's cabin in response to the Sacking of Lawrence. Five pro-slavery people were killed by Brown and his men.  This attack was widely reported around the nation at the time and was one of several incidents that eventually led to the American Civil War.

References
 USGS Geographic Names Information System (GNIS)

External links
 US-Counties.com
 City-Data.com

Townships in Franklin County, Kansas
Townships in Kansas